Marc Hester Hansen (born 28 June 1985) is a Danish professional bicycle racer.

Hester rode for Firefighters Upsala CK for the 2014 season. In December 2014 Hester was announced as part of the inaugural squad for the ONE Pro Cycling team for the 2015 season.

Major results
2005
 2nd  Scratch, UEC European Under-23 Track Championships
2006
 9th Overall Mainfranken Tour
2007
 2nd PWZ Zuidenveld Tour
2011
 3rd Six Days of Bremen (with Jens-Erik Madsen)
2012
 1st  Scratch, National Track Championships
 1st Six Days of Copenhagen (with Iljo Keisse)
2014
 3rd Six Days of Bremen (with Andreas Müller)
2015
 3rd Six Days of Berlin (with Alex Rasmussen)
2019
 2nd Six Days of Berlin (with Jesper Mørkøv)
 2nd Six Days of Rotterdam (with Lasse Norman Hansen)
 2nd Six Days of Bremen (with Theo Reinhardt)
2020
 3rd Six Days of Bremen (with Andreas Graf)

References

External links

Danish male cyclists
1985 births
Living people
Place of birth missing (living people)